We Can Make It may refer to:

Music

Albums
George Jones (We Can Make It)
We Can Make It (George Jones song)
We Can Make It (Peters and Lee album)

Songs
We Can Make It! (Arashi song)
"We Can Make It", a song performed by Johnny Tillotson, Tommy Roe and Brian Hyland for the soundtrack of Rudolph the Red-Nosed Reindeer: The Movie.